Bekir Pasha or Beshir, was an Ottoman governor (Pasha) with the title of Vizier, governing the Bosnia Eyalet from 1800 to 1801, and the Sanjak of Smederevo in 1804.

Sources

Governors of the Ottoman Empire
Ottoman governors of Bosnia
Ottoman military personnel of the Serbian Revolution
People of the First Serbian Uprising
18th-century births
19th-century deaths